Abbotts Lagoon is a two-stage lagoon on the northwestern coast of the Point Reyes National Seashore, southwest of Tomales Point, in California, 
United States. The upper lagoon is a freshwater impoundment that overflows into a lower brackish level with occasional winter tidal exchange. The eastern shore of the lagoon is covered with old growth northern coastal scrub including coyote bush, yellow bush lupine, sword fern and California blackberry.

Geology
Abbotts Lagoon is usually separated from the Pacific Ocean by dune sand to the west. The eastern side of the lagoon is bordered by Miocene marine sediments to the north and Pliocene marine sediments to the south from sedimentary rock formations on the western side of the San Andreas Fault. Santa Margarita Sandstone atop the Monterey Formation forms a ridge along the southern side of the valley containing the upper lagoon, and is exposed along the eastern shoreline of the lower lagoon.

History
Coast Miwok lived in the area before 19th-century European colonization. The lagoon land was used for cattle and dairy ranching by the 1870s. Abbotts Lagoon was variously identified as Abbott's Lagoon Bombing Target, Abbott's Lagoon Target Area, Abbott's Lagoon Bombing Range, and Bombing Range Number Two while used as a dive bomber practice area by pilots from Alameda Naval Air Station and Santa Rosa outlying field from 1941 to 1952. The lagoon was designated part of Point Reyes National Seashore in 1962.

Recreation
Walking trails provide access to observe the birds and wildflowers of the locally unique habitats surrounding Abbotts Lagoon. Brush rabbits, black-tailed jackrabbits, pocket gophers, muskrats, river otter and black-tailed deer may be seen around the lagoon.  Coyote, bobcat, gray fox, long-tailed weasel, striped skunk, raccoon, badger, and cougar are rarely seen.

Birding

Bird species observed at Abbotts Lagoon include:
Auks - common murre - pigeon guillemot
Blackbirds - Brewer's blackbird - brown-headed cowbird - red-winged blackbird - tricolored blackbird
Cormorants - Brandt's cormorant - double-crested cormorant - pelagic cormorant
Ducks - American wigeon - bufflehead - cinnamon teal - common goldeneye - common merganser - gadwall - greater scaup - green-winged teal - lesser scaup - mallard - northern pintail - northern shoveler - red-breasted merganser - ring-necked duck - ruddy duck - surf scoter
Eagles - golden eagle
Falcons - merlin - peregrine falcon - prairie falcon
Finches - American goldfinch - house finch
Geese - black brant
Grebes - black-necked grebe - Clark's grebe - horned grebe - pied-billed grebe - western grebe
Gulls - California gull - common gull - glaucous-winged gull - Heermann's gull - herring gull - ring-billed gull - Thayer's gull - western gull
Hawks - Cooper's hawk - ferruginous hawk - northern harrier - osprey - red-shouldered hawk - red-tailed hawk - rough-legged buzzard - sharp-shinned hawk - white-tailed kite
Herons - American bittern - great blue heron - great egret - snowy egret
Hummingbirds - Allen's hummingbird - Anna's hummingbird
Larks - shore lark - western meadowlark
Loons - black-throated loon - common loon - Pacific loon - red-throated loon
Owls - barn owl - burrowing owl - short-eared owl
Pelicans - brown pelican - great white pelican
Phoebes - black phoebe - Say's phoebe
Pipits - buff-bellied pipit
Plovers - grey plover - western snowy plover - killdeer (The western snowy plover is considered "threatened" under the Endangered Species Act.)
Quail
Rails - American coot - Virginia rail
Raven
Sandpipers - greater yellowlegs - marbled godwit - sanderling - willet - Wilson's snipe
Sparrows - fox sparrow - golden-crowned sparrow - grasshopper sparrow - Savannah sparrow - song sparrow - spotted towhee - white-crowned sparrow
Swallows - barn swallow - cliff swallow - northern rough-winged swallow - tree swallow - violet-green swallow
Swans - trumpeter swan - tundra swan
Terns - Caspian tern - elegant tern
Thrushes - western bluebird
Vulture
Warblers - common yellowthroat - ruby-crowned kinglet - yellow-rumped warbler
Woodpeckers - northern flicker
Wrens - Bewick's wren - marsh wren
Wrentit

Flora
Abbotts Lagoon is the location of the single remaining natural population of the endangered plant species Sonoma spineflower (Chorizanthe valida).

See also
 List of lakes in the San Francisco Bay Area
 List of lakes in California

References

External links
 River otter in Abbotts Lagoon 
 Abbotts Lagoon: Calflora Great Places to View Native Plants
Lagoons of Marin County, California
Lagoons of California
Wetlands of the San Francisco Bay Area